Erica Buratto (born 31 December 1984) is an Italian swimmer who won three medals in freestyle relays at the 2011 and 2012 European Aquatics Championships.

Notes

References

External links 
 

1984 births
Living people
Italian female swimmers
Italian female freestyle swimmers
European Aquatics Championships medalists in swimming
Mediterranean Games gold medalists for Italy
Swimmers at the 2009 Mediterranean Games
Universiade medalists in swimming
World Games gold medalists
Mediterranean Games medalists in swimming
Competitors at the 2005 World Games
Universiade silver medalists for Italy
Universiade bronze medalists for Italy
Medalists at the 2009 Summer Universiade
21st-century Italian women